Isochariesthes brunneopunctipennis is a species of beetle in the family Cerambycidae. It was described by Hunt and Stephan von Breuning in 1966.

References

brunneomaculata
Beetles described in 1966